Claude Cummings (2 July 1917 – 24 October 1965) was  a former Australian rules footballer who played with Richmond in the Victorian Football League (VFL).

Notes

External links 

1917 births
1965 deaths
Australian rules footballers from Victoria (Australia)
Richmond Football Club players